Future Rhythm is the fourth album by the American rap group Digital Underground, released in 1996. It was their first independent release. Two songs from the album were included on the soundtrack to the Wayans brother's film Don't Be a Menace to South Central While Drinking Your Juice in the Hood: "Food Fight", which showcases Humpty Hump and Del the Funky Homosapien trading verses, and "We Got More", with the Luniz.

The album peaked at No. 113 on the Billboard 200.

Critical reception
The Los Angeles Times wrote that the album "sports a nice, laid-back take on George Clinton's elaborately semi-chaotic P-Funk production approach." The San Diego Union-Tribune opined that "the mellow grooves of 'Walk Real Kool', 'Future Rhythm' and 'Stylin' simply fall flat."

Track listing
"`Walk Real Kool"
"Glooty-Us-Maximus" (featuring Saafir & Numskull)
"Oregano Flow (Gumbo Soup Mix)"
"Fool Get a Clue" (featuring The Black Spooks)
Samples "Funk Gets Stronger (Part 1)" by Funkadelic
"Rumpty Rump"
"Food Fight" (featuring Del the Funky Homosapien)
"Future Rhythm"
"Hokis Pokis (A Classic Case)"
"We Got More" (featuring Luniz)
"Hella Bump"
"Stylin'" (featuring Kenya Gruve)
"Midnite Snack"
"Oregano Flow (Hot Sauce Mix)"
"Want It All"

References

1996 albums
Digital Underground albums